Rhinolekos britskii is a species of catfish in the family Loricariidae. It is native to South America, where it occurs in the Paranaíba River basin in the upper Paraná River system in Brazil. The species reaches 4 cm (1.6 inches) in standard length. Its specific name, britskii, honors Heraldo A. Britski of the University of São Paulo for his contributions to the ichthyology of the Neotropical realm.

References 

Loricariidae
Fish described in 2011
Catfish of South America
Fish of Brazil